This is a list of all the records and statistics of rugby league side Bradford Bulls. It concentrates on the records of the team and the performances of the players who have played for this team. Since the re-brand in 1996 the Bulls have gone on to win many honours and awards. Under the re-brand the Bulls played their first game against Batley Bulldogs in the 1996 Challenge Cup on 4 February 1996, Bradford won the match 60–18. As of 7 October 2021 the Bulls have played 788 games.

Team records

Team wins, losses, ties and draws

Matches played

Results summary

Highest scores

Lowest scores

Biggest wins

Biggest losses

Individual records

Most matches as captain

Most career appearances

Most career points

Most career tries

Most career goals

Most career drop goals

Most points in a season

Most tries in a season

Most goals in a season

Most drop goals in a season

Most points in a match

Most tries in a match

Most goals in a match

Most drop goals in a match

Attendance records

Season average attendance

Highest match attendance

Coaching

Coaching records

References

Statistics